Arkiv för nordisk filologi is an annual academic journal of Old Norse and older Scandinavian studies, published by Lund University. It was established in 1882 and was the first scholarly periodical entirely devoted to the field.

The creation of such a journal was discussed at the 1881 convention on Nordic philology, and it began publication in Christiania (now Oslo) in 1882 (volume 1, 1882/83) under the editorship of Gustav Storm, as Arkiv för nordisk filologi. It was the first journal devoted entirely to the field of Old Norse studies. With the fifth volume, dated 1889, it began a new series, with subsequent issues bearing two volume numbers, and moved to Lund, where it was edited by Axel Kock, and the spelling was changed to the Swedish för.

The journal is now published with assistance from the Axel Kocks fond för nordisk filologi. It has appeared annually since 1966; prior to that it published quarterly. It publishes an annual review of new publications in Scandinavian language studies, Litteraturkrönika; from 1886 to 1948, there was a complete listing, published annually at first, then every three years.

Past editors 
1883–1888: Gustav Storm
1889–1928: Axel Kock
1929–1937: Emil Olson
1939–1942: Erik Noreen
1944–1967: Karl Gustav Ljunggren
1968–1978: Ture Johannisson
1979–1987: Sven Benson
1988–1996: Bengt Pamp and Christer Platzack
1997–2007: Göran Hallberg and Christer Platzack

References

Further reading
 Sven Benson. "ANF 100 år". Arkiv för nordisk filologi 1982, pp. 199–204

External links 
 
 Archive of Volumes 1–24, 1883–1908 at Project Runeberg
 Archive of Volumes 1–39, 1883–1923, at Hathi Trust Digital Library
 Arkiv for nordisk filologi at Heimskringla.no 

Academic journals published by university presses
Annual journals
Multilingual journals
Publications established in 1882
Germanic philology journals